Buddha Park, also known as Xieng Khuan (as well as other variations of the spelling), is a sculpture park 25 km southeast from Vientiane, Laos in a meadow by the Mekong River. Although it is not a temple (Wat), it may be referred to as Wat Xieng Khuan (Lao: ວັດຊຽງຄວນ;) since it contains numerous religious images. The name Xieng Khuan means Spirit City. The park contains over 200 Hindu and Buddhist statues. The socialist government operates Buddha Park as a tourist attraction and public park.

Overview
The park was started in 1958 by Luang Pu (Venerable Grandfather) Bunleua Sulilat. Luang Pu Bunleua Sulilat was a priest-shaman who integrated Hinduism and Buddhism. His unique perspective was influenced by a Hindu rishi under whom he studied in Vietnam. After the revolution in 1975, anxious about the repercussions of the rule of Pathet Lao, he fled from Laos to Thailand where he built another sculpture park, Sala Keoku in Nong Khai. Both parks are located right next to the Thai-Lao border (Mekong river), only a few kilometres apart from each other, and the tallest structures of the Buddha Park can actually be seen from the Thai side of Mekong.

The statues are made of reinforced concrete and are ornate, and sometimes bizarre, in design. The statues appear to be centuries old, though they are not. There are sculptures of humans, gods, animals, and demons. There are numerous sculptures of Buddha, characters of Buddhist beliefs like Avalokiteśvara, and characters of Hindu lore, including Shiva, Vishnu, and Arjuna. These sculptures were presumably cast by unskilled workers under the supervision of Luang Pu Bunleua Sulilat. One notable sculpture resembles a giant pumpkin. It has three stories representing three levels - Hell, Earth and Heaven. Each story contains sculptures depicting the level. At the top, there is a vantage point where the entire park is visible. Another sculpture, an enormous  reclining Buddha, is also a park attraction.

Buddha park gallery

See also
Wat Rong Khun
Sanctuary of Truth
Wat Pa Maha Chedi Kaew
Park of the Monsters
Visionary environments
Outsider art

References

Notes
John Maizels, Deidi von Schaewen (photo), Angelika Taschen (ed.), Fantasy Worlds, Taschen (2007), pp. 218-219.

External links

Current views of Buddha Park

Buildings and structures in Vientiane
Protected areas of Laos
Colossal Buddha statues
Laotian art
Sculpture gardens, trails and parks in Asia
Visionary environments
20th century in Vientiane
Tourist attractions in Vientiane
Hinduism in Laos
Buddhism in Laos